HTU may refer to:

Universities 
 Hokkaido Tokai University in Japan
 Holy Trinity University, in Puerto Princesa City, Palawan, Philippines
 Huston–Tillotson University, in Austin, Texas, United States

Other uses
 Hashtag United, a YouTube-based association football club
 Hitu language, spoken in Indonesia
 Hongtu Airlines, a Chinese airline
 Hopetoun Airport, in Victoria, Australia
 Hydrothermal upgrading